Edmond Guibord (September 17, 1894 – December 16, 1971) was a politician in the Quebec, Canada.  He served as Member of the Legislative Assembly.

Early life

He was born on September 17, 1894, in Montreal.

City Politics

He was mayor of Grand-Mère, Quebec from 1923 to 1930 and council member of the same city from 1937 to 1941.

Federal Politics

He ran as a Liberal candidate in the federal district of Champlain in 1930 and lost.

Provincial Politics

Guibord ran as a Liberal candidate to the Legislative Assembly of Quebec in the district of Laviolette in 1936 and lost.  In 1939 though, he ran again and defeated Union Nationale incumbent Romulus Ducharme.

He did not run for re-election in 1944.

Death

He died on December 16, 1971, in the Montreal area.

References

1894 births
1971 deaths
Politicians from Montreal
Quebec Liberal Party MNAs